Samoeng is a district (amphoe) of Chiang Mai province in northern Thailand.

Geography
Neighbouring districts are (from the north clockwise) Mae Taeng, Mae Rim, Hang Dong, Mae Wang, Mae Chaem, and Galyani Vadhana of Chiang Mai Province and Pai of Mae Hong Son province.

Environment
Most years, air quality in Samoeng declines in March–April due to field burning and forest fires. In April 2019, Samoeng's air quality declined to levels heretofore unseen. To blame were forest fires in the hills surrounding the valley. Readings by the Chiang Mai Air Quality Health Index (CMAQHI) showed air quality index (AQI) scores in Samoeng's tambon Yang Moen had exceeded 500, the highest level the AQI can record. The AQI measures a spectrum of air pollutants including PM2.5, PM10, and carbon dioxide. PM2.5 is particulate matter (PM) with a diameter of less than 2.5 micrometres, or about 3% the diameter of a human hair. It can lodge in the lungs and enter blood vessels, leading to respiratory and cardiovascular disease.

History
The district was originally created in 1902 as a minor district (king amphoe). It was upgraded to a full district in 1908, downgraded to a minor district in 1938, and returned to its current designation as a full district in 1958.

Administration
The district is divided into five sub-districts (tambon), which are further subdivided into 45 villages (muban). Samoeng Tai is a sub-district municipality (thesaban tambon), which covers parts of tambon Samoeng Tai. There are a further four tambon administrative organizations (TAO).

Economy
The Royal Project Agricultural Station Pang Da near Samoeng Tai conducts plant research, primarily on tropical fruit trees, temperate fruit trees such as the fig, flowers, beans, vetiver, rapid-growth trees, and medical cannabis.

References

External links

amphoe.com (Thai)

Samoeng
Populated places in Chiang Mai province